McFrey Crossroads is an unincorporated community in Cherokee County, Alabama, United States.

History
McFrey Crossroads was named in honor of Walter McFry.

References

Unincorporated communities in Cherokee County, Alabama
Unincorporated communities in Alabama